The Six Days of Turin is a six-day track cycling race held annually in Turin, Italy since 2001.

Winners

References

Cycle races in Italy
Sport in Turin
Six-day races
Recurring sporting events established in 2001
2001 establishments in Italy